Magway Airport is an airport in Magway, Myanmar.Analysis of Google Earth imagery confirms it is also the base for several types of fighter aircraft belonging to the Myanmar Air Force.

Two jets from Magway Air Base crashed in adverse weather conditions on 16 October 2018, killing the pilots and a civilian on the ground.

The airport had been an Allied air base during the Second World War (known as Magwe)

Airlines and destinations

References

Airports in Myanmar